The 2012–13 Midland Football Combination season was the 76th in the history of Midland Football Combination, a football competition in England.

Premier Division

The Premier Division featured 13 clubs which competed in the division last season, along with six new clubs.
Clubs promoted from the Division One:
Blackwood
Bromsgrove Sporting
Lichfield City
Littleton

Plus:
Atherstone Town, relegated from the Midland Football Alliance
Stafford Town, transferred from the West Midlands (Regional) League

League table

Results

References

External links
 Midland Football Combination

2012-13
10